Congress of Micronesia may refer to either:
 Congress of the Federated States of Micronesia
 Congress of the Trust Territory of the Pacific Islands